Enantia albania, the costa-spotted mimic-white, is a butterfly in the family Pieridae. It is native to tropical Mexico and Central America, but rare strays have been reported from the Lower Rio Grande Valley in Texas. The habitat consists of low- to mid-elevation tropical forests and coffee plantations.

The forewings are smaller than the hindwings. The upperside of the males is yellow and the upperside of the females is pale yellow to white with black at the apex and outer margin. Adults are on wing for a long period in Mexico, but have only been reported in September in southern Texas. There are multiple generations per year on Cuba and Hispaniola. They feed on flower nectar and bird droppings in the forest understory.

The larvae probably feed on Fabaceae species.

Subspecies
The following subspecies are recognised:
Enantia albania albania (Guatemala, Mexico)
Enantia albania amalia (Staudinger, 1884) (Panama, Nicaragua)
Enantia albania nuria Lamas, 2004 (Ecuador)

References

Dismorphiinae
Butterflies described in 1864
Pieridae of South America
Taxa named by Henry Walter Bates
Butterflies of North America